Mangifera orophila is a species of plant in the family Anacardiaceae. It is a tree endemic to Peninsular Malaysia.

References

orophila
Endemic flora of Peninsular Malaysia
Trees of Peninsular Malaysia
Vulnerable plants
Taxonomy articles created by Polbot
Taxa named by André Joseph Guillaume Henri Kostermans